Kael-Florent Montout (born 21 November 1991) is a Guadeloupean footballer. He currently plays for the French club Avant-Garde caennaise

References

1991 births
Living people
French footballers
Guadeloupean footballers
French people of Guadeloupean descent
Vannes OC players
US Alençon players
FC Saint-Lô Manche players
Les Herbiers VF players
Ligue 2 players
Championnat National 2 players
Championnat National 3 players
Association football midfielders